Jeffrey Gallagher (born December 29, 1964) is an American professional golfer who played on the PGA Tour and the Nationwide Tour. He is the younger brother of five-time PGA Tour winner Jim Gallagher Jr. and LPGA Tour golfer Jackie Gallagher-Smith.

Gallagher has won twice on the Nationwide Tour, once in 1991 at the Ben Hogan Cleveland Open and another in 2000 at the BUY.COM South Carolina Classic. He nearly won again at the 2009 Rex Hospital Open when he lost in a one-hole playoff to Kevin Johnson after Johnson birdied the first playoff hole, while Gallagher parred it.

Professional wins (2)

Nationwide Tour wins (2)

Nationwide Tour playoff record (0–1)

Results in major championships

CUT = missed the halfway cut
Note: Reese only played in the U.S. Open.

See also
1995 PGA Tour Qualifying School graduates
1997 PGA Tour Qualifying School graduates
2000 Buy.com Tour graduates

External links

American male golfers
Ball State Cardinals men's golfers
PGA Tour golfers
PGA Tour Champions golfers
Korn Ferry Tour graduates
Golfers from Indiana
Golfers from Nevada
People from Marion, Indiana
People from Henderson, Nevada
1964 births
Living people